Louis Barry Rosenberg (born 1969) is an American engineer, researcher, inventor, and entrepreneur. He researches augmented reality, virtual reality, and artificial intelligence. He was the Cotchett Endowed Professor of Educational Technology at the California Polytechnic State University, San Luis Obispo. He founded the Immersion Corporation and Unanimous A.I., and he wrote the screenplay for the 2009 romantic comedy film, Lab Rats.

Early life and family

Louis Rosenberg was born in 1969. His parents purchased his first computer in 1980 and he began writing programs. He has said, "If I spelled things wrong it would give me a syntax error and let me try again... that's a helpful feature for someone who is dyslexic."

Rosenberg earned a B.S. (1991), M.S. (1993), and Ph.D. (1994) in Mechanical Engineering from Stanford University. His daughter, Zoe Rosenberg, is an animal rights activist.

Career 
From 1991 to 1994, Rosenberg was a researcher of virtual and augmented reality at Stanford University, NASA Ames Research Center, and Air Force Research Laboratory (formerly Armstrong Laboratory).

In 1993, Rosenberg founded Immersion Corporation, and later served as its CEO until 2000.
 
In 1999, Logitech released the first haptic-enabled computer mouse using FEELit technology he developed with other researchers at Immersion Corporation. As CEO, he brought the company public on NASDAQ in 1999 and it remains public today trading as "IMMR" as a part of Russell 2000 component. 

In 2002, Rosenberg founded Outland Research, a company that developed augmented reality technology.

In 2005, Rosenberg joined the faculty of California Polytechnic State University, San Luis Obispo (Cal Poly), as an assistant professor. Later, he became the Cotchett Endowed Professor of Educational Technology at Cal Poly.

In 2014, Rosenberg founded Unanimous A.I. on the basis of a novel technology known as Artificial Swarm Intelligence, which is based on the decision-making abilities of biological swarms and is utilized to enhance the collective intelligence of networked human groups.

Rosenberg has been a vocal critic of the potential risks that virtual reality, augmented reality, and artificial intelligence pose to society in recent years. As an author, he has written about these technologies for VentureBeat and Big Think.

Research
In 2014, Rosenberg started research in a relatively new sub-field of AI, now known as, artificial swarm intelligence (swarm AI in short), that aims to amplify the intelligence of human groups using AI algorithms modeled on biological swarms. In 2014, he founded Unanimous A.I., an artificial intelligence company. He has served as the company's CEO since the company was founded.

Rosenberg conducted early research into virtual and augmented reality at NASA's Ames Research Center and at the Air Force Research Laboratory, developing the Virtual Fixtures platform, one of the first prototype augmented reality systems to enable human subjects to interact with mixed reality of real and virtual objects.

From 2018 to 2020, Rosenberg collaborated with researchers at Stanford University School of Medicine on a National Science Foundation funded study conducted on groups of radiologists, which was published in Nature Digital Medicine on "Human–machine partnership with artificial intelligence for chest radiograph diagnosis", related to the symbiosis of human experts and AI deep learning algorithms. With the help of researchers from the Massachusetts Institute of Technology (MIT), he studied applications of Swarm AI in order to create so-called "hive minds" of financial analysts for equity markets.
 
Rosenberg's research has focused on using AI algorithms modeled on biological swarms to support group decision-making in various fields including forecasting, estimation, and diagnosis.

Writing 
Rosenberg studied screenwriting at UCLA School of Theater, Film and Television. In 2009,he wrote the screenplay for the short romantic comedy film Lab Rats directed by Sam Washington. The short won awards at the Moondance International Film Festival and the Ventura Film Festival. He also wrote a feature film screenplay entitled The Manuscript in collaboration with another writer, Joe Rosenbaum, which was sold in 2018 for screen adaptation.

Selected publications

References

External links
  (video, 15:58 minutes)
  Patents by Inventor Louis B. Rosenberg

1969 births
Living people
21st-century American businesspeople
21st-century American engineers
21st-century American inventors
21st-century American screenwriters
21st-century American male writers
American male screenwriters
American technology company founders
Artificial intelligence researchers
Businesspeople from California
Engineers from California
Screenwriters from California
Stanford University School of Engineering alumni
UCLA Film School alumni
Scientists with dyslexia